The 2014 Phillips 66 Big 12 men's basketball tournament was the postseason men's basketball tournament for the Big 12 Conference held from March 12 to 15 in Kansas City, Missouri at Sprint Center.

Seeding
The Tournament consisted of a 10 team single-elimination tournament with the top 6 seeds receiving a bye.

Schedule

Bracket

* denotes overtime period

All-Tournament Team
Most Outstanding Player – DeAndre Kane, Iowa State

See also
2014 Big 12 Conference women's basketball tournament
2014 NCAA Division I men's basketball tournament
2013–14 NCAA Division I men's basketball rankings

References

External links
Official 2014 Big 12 Men's Basketball Tournament Bracket
 

Tournament
Big 12 men's basketball tournament
Big 12 men's basketball tournament
Big 12 men's basketball tournament
College sports tournaments in Missouri